Cannoneer Jabůrek, published in 1884, is a cantastoria that mocks war propaganda that often made up stories about military heroism. It is one of the most popular parodies of  kramářská píseň, the Czech form of cantastoria.

The song is a story of a valiant cannoneer Jabůrek who, as the song says, took part in the Battle of Königgrätz (1866). Even after the enemy's cannonballs tore off both his arms, he continued to load his cannon with bare feet, etc. When his head was torn off, it flew to the general and said: "Reporting, I cannot give a salute." The song further says that for his valiance he was promoted into nobility to be named Edler von den Jabůrek, and that he had no head, no big deal, because there was plenty of headless nobility already. No real event is described in the song; however, at the times there were newspaper reports and legends describing various kinds of exaggerated heroism.

The song about Jabůrek is sung in the book about the good soldier Švejk.

The brave cannoneer is in the center of the plot of a satirical radio play Jaburek by Austrian playwright Franz Hiesel.

There is a tavern U Kanonýra Jabůrka in Sadová, a place around which the battle was held.

In 1968  recorded a single KRÁLOVÉ HRADECKÉ ZVONY / KANONÝR JABŮREK.

In 1985 the Czech folk band  recorded the song with Supraphon in the LP album Tam u Královýho Hradce.

See also
List of anti-war songs

References

1884 songs
Anti-war songs
Czech songs
Czech humour
Songs about soldiers
Songs about the military